The following is a list of the highest-grossing second weekends for films. Usually by the second weekend in the U.S. and Canada, studios can have an idea of what the final gross may be now that factors such as word-of-mouth and increased competition are starting to show. Many films usually have big drops as they could be "frontloaded" as fans want to watch them on opening weekend to be first to see it, but some could stay relatively modest as word-of-mouth works in the films' favor. The following shows how much the film has dropped compared to its opening weekend. Like the highest-grossing openings, the list is dominated by recent films due to steadily increasing production and marketing budgets, and modern films opening on more screens. Another contributing factor is inflation not being taken into account.

Biggest second weekends in the U.S. and Canada
A list of biggest second weekend for  films  between the second Friday and second Sunday of release.

Second weekend record holders in U.S. and Canada
These are the films that, when first released, set the second three-day weekend record after going into wide release.

See also

Second weekend in box office performance
List of highest-grossing openings for films
List of highest-grossing openings for animated films

References

Film-related lists
Film box office